Cracovie tram stop is a tram stop on line C of the Tramway de Bordeaux. It is located on Allée de Boutaut, which forms the boundary between the city of Bordeaux and the commune of Bruges. The stop is operated by Transports Bordeaux Métropole.

For most of the day on Mondays to Fridays, trams run at least every five minutes in both directions, with alternate northbound trains taking the two branches. Services run less frequently in the early morning, late evenings, weekends and public holidays.

The tram stop has two tracks, served by two side platforms, and is situated in the central reservation of the Allée de Boutaut. Immediately to the north of the stop, the branch to Gare de Blanquefort diverges to the west and joins the trackbed of the former rail link to the Bassins à flot, whilst the branch to  continues in the centre of the Allée de Boutaut.

References

Tram stops in Bordeaux
Tram stops in Bruges, Gironde
Bordeaux tramway stops
Railway stations in France opened in 2016